Several Canadian naval units have been named HMCS St. Laurent.

HMCS St. Laurent (H83) (I) initially served the Royal Navy as the Interwar Standard C-class destroyer  before transfer to the Royal Canadian Navy for service as a River-class destroyer in the Second World War
 (II) was the lead ship of the Cold War s

Battle honours
Atlantic 1939–45
Normandy 1944

See also
 UK Royal Navy ships named

References
 Government of Canada Ship's Histories - HMCS St. Laurent

Citations

Set index articles on ships
Royal Canadian Navy ship names